Geoffrey Quinton Michael Doidge (26 April 1954 – 11 December 2022) was a South African politician and was South Africa's High Commissioner to Sri Lanka. He previously served as the country's Minister of Public Works from 5 September 2008 to 31 October 2010.

Career in politics
Doidge was Deputy Chief Whip of the African National Congress (ANC).

In January 2001, he was appointed by the ANC in the place of Andrew Feinstein, as chair of its study group on public accounts and ANC's official spokesman on the National Assembly's public accounts committee.

References

1954 births
2022 deaths
Members of the National Assembly of South Africa
African National Congress politicians
Government ministers of South Africa
High Commissioners of South Africa to Sri Lanka